Brian Agustin Arregui (born 15 January 2000) is an Argentine boxer. He competed in the men's welterweight event at the 2020 Summer Olympics.

Professional boxing record

References

External links
 

2000 births
Living people
Argentine male boxers
Olympic boxers of Argentina
Boxers at the 2020 Summer Olympics
Sportspeople from Entre Ríos Province
Boxers at the 2018 Summer Youth Olympics
Youth Olympic gold medalists for Argentina